Rezkalla Mohamed Abdelrehim (born 13 May 1978) is an Egyptian boxer. He competed in the 2000 Summer Olympics.

References

1978 births
Living people
Boxers at the 2000 Summer Olympics
Egyptian male boxers
Olympic boxers of Egypt
Mediterranean Games silver medalists for Egypt
Mediterranean Games medalists in boxing
Competitors at the 2001 Mediterranean Games
Light-flyweight boxers
21st-century Egyptian people